Beechupally  in Jogulamba Gadwal district, Telangana, India, is one of the famous shrines for the god Hanuman (Anjaneya Swamy). It is located on the banks of Krishna River about 30 kilometers downstream from the Jurala Project.

The shores of Krishna River at this location are noted for carrying out obsequies to the departed souls as per the Hindu custom.

The development of the shrine has been augmented by the passage of national highway NH7 through the village. A road bridge built in the 1950s helped trading between Telangana and Rayalaseema regions of Andhra Pradesh. The bridge was one of the first connections between central/north India and south India.

This highway has been renumbered as NH-44 [National Highway 44 (India)].

Initially, the shrine consisted of a Hanuman temple about 200 meters away from the river and a Shiva lingam temple near the river. During the rainy season, the water flow becomes high enough to touch the Shiva lingam temple. A temple for Lord Rama was also built in the area in 1992. For the convenience of devotees, several ghats were built for pushkara snanam, a sacred bath that takes place every 12 years. Since then its development continued to expand. In 2004 the shrine was developed with greater facilities, making it one of the major places for pushkara snanam (sacred dip).

During the 2016 Krishna pushkaras the government of Telangana State made elaborate arrangements and constructed several ghats for the pilgrims.

The Beechupally shrine is near two islands on the Krishna River. The larger island (Gurram Gadda village) has an area of about 10 km2 and is populated by farmers due to its soil fertility. A smaller island on the east side is called Nizam Konda: its port belongs to the Nawabs of Nizam.

Residential school
Beechupally has a residential school for boys, with classes starting from Class V up to Class X. This residential school received several state ranks over the past 30 years. This school started originally in the premises of Beechupally Anjaneya Swamy Temple and later moved to its own building in Beechupally.

Photo gallery

References

Hindu temples in Mahbubnagar district